Karin Telser (born 23 April 1966) is a former figure skater who competed internationally for Italy and was the 1981-84 Italian champion. She was born in Tscherms, Italy.

Results

References
 Karin Telser's profile at Sports Reference.com

Olympic figure skaters of Italy
Figure skaters at the 1984 Winter Olympics
Italian female single skaters
Living people
People from Tscherms
Germanophone Italian people
1966 births
Sportspeople from Südtirol